Eric Steckel (born 1990) is an American blues singer, guitarist, songwriter, and record producer. To date, Steckel has released 12 albums, and toured worldwide sharing the billing with Steve Vai, Gregg Allman, Johnny Winter, John Mayall, Ray Charles, Larry Carlton, Robben Ford, and others. In 2021, Steckel was named one of "10 Future Blues Stars” by Guitar Player.

Career
Steckel was born in Lehigh County, Pennsylvania. A young talent on the guitar, Steckel recorded his debut album, A Few Degrees Warmer (2002), at the age of 11. The collection contained three tracks written, or co-written, by Steckel. A year later he became the youngest musician to perform with John Mayall & the Bluesbreakers, having been invited to play with them on stage, following his own appearance in the 2003 Sarasota Blues Fest. In 2004, Steckel joined John Mayall and his ensemble on tour in Scandinavia. The following year, Steckel recorded with Mayall in Los Angeles, providing guitar work on one track on the latter's Road Dogs album  Steckel's next own album, High Action, followed.

Steckel then issued several studio and live albums, including Feels Like Home (2008), where he employed the percussionist Duane Trucks on drums.  The album's overall sound evoked the feel of  1970s southern rock. In addition, Steckel toured widely particularly throughout Europe, where he supported Johnny Winter at the Paradiso in Amsterdam, performed at the Tegelen Bluesrock Festival and shared the bill at the Pistoia Blues Festival with Gregg Allman. He also in May 2010 performed at the Café Wilhelmina in  Eindhoven, and played on a number of occasions at Musikfest. In 2012, he recorded the studio album, Dismantle The Sun. It was promoted by Steckel's first UK tour, and the album contained seven tracks co-written by him plus his version of the Mel London penned "Sugar Sweet" (as originally recorded by Muddy Waters), which incorporated blues harmonica from Steve Guyger. In 2015, Steckel made his first transatlantic studio album, when Black Gold was jointly recorded in Nashville, Tennessee and Amsterdam, Netherlands.

His 2008 release, Polyphonic Prayer saw the emergence of what Steckel considers his 'bluesmetal' era, with more up to date guitar and production styles. It saw Steckel tackle every instrument on the album, apart from the drums. Grandview Drive (2020) took the 'bluesmetal' sound onwards, and included full Steckel production credits, before the COVID-19 pandemic curtailed activities for many. Steckel has been featured in Premier Guitar, Guitar Player, Guitarist, Guitar World, Classic Rock, The Morning Call, The Intelligencer, The Philadelphia Inquirer, Times Herald-Record, Sarasota Herald-Tribune, and The Florida Times-Union. International press includes a feature in the Haagsche Courant. He has appeared on NBC 10, Comcast CN8, SNN6, and Reuters TV.

In March 2022, Steckel took his Los Angeles-based rhythm section to Steve Lukather's Steakhouse Studio in North Hollywood for an impromptu live session. Using zero autotune, samples, overdubs or re-takes, Steckel and his band performed a live set of original material, which was captured on tape and video. The Steakhouse Sessions: Vol. 1 (released September 23) is Steckel's latest release on his own Bluzmtl Records label. Later the same year, Steckel undertook his first tour of the UK for eight years. He commented "I've been on the road since I was 12 years old and there’s no place on Earth I'd rather be than on stage. I am beyond thrilled to be finally returning to the stage in Spring 2022". In April and May that year he performed across parts of Europe, and recommenced those activities in September and October.

Discography

Albums

References

External links

Eric Steckel "El Camino" from Black Gold @ YouTube

1990 births
Living people
21st-century American guitarists
21st-century American male singers
21st-century American singers
American blues guitarists
American blues singer-songwriters
American male guitarists
American male songwriters
Blues rock musicians
Musicians from Pennsylvania
Songwriters from Pennsylvania
People from Lehigh County, Pennsylvania
Record producers from Pennsylvania